The High National Election Commission is a body created in Libya for organising elections following the 2011 Libyan Civil War, starting in 2012.

Creation
The High National Election Commission (HNEC) was involved in organising the 2012 Libyan parliamentary election after the 2011 civil war that overthrew Muammar Gaddafi. The HNEC's chairman at the time was Nuri al-Abbar. The aim of the election was to replace the National Transitional Council created during the civil war by a representative General National Congress (GNC).

Leadership
From 2016 to early 2020, the HNEC Board members were Emad al-Shadly al-Sayah, Rabab Mohammed Halab, Abdelhakim al-Shaab Belkhair and Abubakr Ali Marda.

Transitional institutions
HNEC continued organising elections during the Libyan Crisis (2011–present). It organised the 2014 Libyan Constitutional Assembly election that elected a constituent assembly that wrote the 2017 draft Libyan constitution. HNEC organised the 2014 Libyan parliamentary election that aimed to replace the GNC by a new parliament, the House of Representatives (HoR).

Municipal elections also were held in Libya in 2014. Under Article 157 of the 2017 draft constitution, the Central Commission of Municipal Council Elections (CCMCE) was created to organise the following set of municipal elections, in coordination with HNEC, in 2018. The CCMCE started running the 2019 Libyan local elections in early 2019.

References

External links

Libya
Elections in Libya